Mykyta Pogorielov (born 24 September 2002) is a Ukrainian ice dancer. With his skating partner, Mariia Pinchuk, he is the 2022 JGP Latvia bronze medalist, a two-time Ukrainian junior national champion (2021, 2022), and competed in the final segment at the 2022 World Junior Figure Skating Championships.

Personal life 
Pogorielov was born on 24 September 2002 in Kharkiv, Ukraine. Pogorielov fled Kharkiv during the 2022 Russian invasion of Ukraine. He currently resides in Austria with Pinchuk and her mother, while his parents and brother found refuge in Spain.

As of 2022, Pogorielov studies online at the Kharkiv School of Architecture.

Programs

With Pinchuk

Competitive highlights 
JGP: Junior Grand Prix

With Pinchuk

References

External links 
 

2002 births
Living people
Ukrainian male ice dancers
Sportspeople from Kharkiv